Pettah is a neighbourhood in Colombo, Sri Lanka located east of the city centre Fort, and behind the Colombo Port. The Pettah neighborhood is famous for the Pettah Market, a series of open air bazaars and markets. It is one of Sri Lanka's busiest commercial areas, where a huge number of wholesale and retail shops, buildings, commercial institutions and other organisations are located.

The main market segment is designed like a gigantic crossword puzzle, where one may traverse through the entire markets from dawn till dusk, but not completely cover every part of it.

Today, the Sinhala phrase,  (outside the fort) conveniently describes the same place.

Demographics 
Pettah is a multi-religious and multi-ethnic area. Moors, Bohras and Memons are the predominant ethnic group found within Pettah, however an average amount of Sinhalese and Tamil populations also exist. There are also various other minorities, such as Burghers, Malays and others. Religions include Buddhism, Hinduism, Islam, Christianity and various other religions and beliefs to a lesser extent.

Buildings and landmarks 
Notable landmarks in the neighborhood include:
 Wolvendaal Church
 Jami Ul-Alfar Mosque
 Kayman's Gate
 Former Colombo Town Hall
 Colombo Dutch Museum
 Sammangodu Sri Kathirvelayutha Swami Kovil
 Old Town Hall Market
 Federation of Self Employees Market
 Manning Market
 Pettah Floating Market
Cross Street Bazaars
Central Bus Station
 Khan Clock Tower

References

Districts of Colombo
Populated places in Western Province, Sri Lanka